Linha Universidade or LinhaUni is the company responsible for the construction and operation of São Paulo Metro Line 6-Orange for 24 years (2020-2044), through a public-private partnership concession, in partnership with the Government of the State of São Paulo. Its main associate is Spanish group Acciona.

Line 6, in its first phase, will have  of extension, and will connect stations Brasilândia and São Joaquim, being completely underground.

LinhaUni rolling stock
Line 6 will have a rolling stock of 22 trains, with 6 cars each, to be made by Alstom.

See also
 Line 6 (São Paulo Metro)
 Acciona

References

External links
 

Companies based in São Paulo (state)
São Paulo Metro
Railway companies of Brazil
Railway companies established in 2019
Brazilian companies established in 2019